The Sam Bell Maxey House is a historic house in Paris, Lamar County, Texas. Samuel Bell Maxey, a prominent local attorney and later two-term U.S. senator, built the large two-story house after serving as a major general in the Confederate Army. It is built in the High Victorian Italianate style.

From 1868 to 1966, the house was the home of Samuel B. Maxey and his family. It was added to the National Register of Historic Places listings in Lamar County, Texas  on March 18, 1971. The house was designated a Recorded Texas Historic Landmark in 1962.  Restoration was completed September 1, 1980, and it was opened to the public on a tour basis. On January 1, 2008, the house was transferred from the Texas Parks and Wildlife Department to the Texas Historical Commission and is now operated at the Sam Bell Maxey House State Historic Site.

Gallery

See also

National Register of Historic Places listings in Lamar County, Texas
List of Texas state historic sites
Recorded Texas Historic Landmarks in Lamar County

References

External links

Historic house museums in Texas
Museums in Lamar County, Texas
Biographical museums in Texas
Houses in Lamar County, Texas
Houses on the National Register of Historic Places in Texas
Recorded Texas Historic Landmarks
Texas state historic sites
National Register of Historic Places in Lamar County, Texas